Harbinger is the second album released by Dan Seals as a solo artist. Two tracks "Can't Get You Out of My Mind", and "I Could Be Lovin' You Right Now" were both released as singles, but both failed to chart. This is his last album for Atlantic, before switching to Liberty/Capitol in 1983. This album was finally released on CD on October 17, 2006.

Track listing
"Can't Get You Out of My Mind" (Steve Wilson, Kelly Wilson) - 4:28
"I Could Be Lovin' You Right Now" (Pam Tillis, Jarrett Washington II) - 4:00
"It's Not Gonna Be That Easy" (Deborah Allen, Eddie Struzick, Rafe Van Hoy) - 3:23
"In My Heart" (Rick Bowles, Richard Putnam) - 3:29
"It Will Be Alright" (David Foster, Jay Graydon, Allee Willis) - 3:51
"I Don't Believe I'll Fall in Love Again" (Dan Seals, Van Hoy) - 3:56
"Once in a While" (Alan Tarney) - 4:12
"Up to Me" (Glen Ballard, Mark Mueller) - 3:30
"Not Every Heart Succeeds" (Newton, Noble, Pippin, Spriggs) - 3:36
"Bad News" (Seals, Van Hoy) - 5:07
"Harbinger, Sage or Fool" (Seals) - 4:25

Personnel 
Dan Seals - lead vocals
Shane Keister, Randy McCormick, Bobby Ogdin, Kelly Wilson - keyboards
James Stroud -  synthesizer, Synclavier programming 
Larry Byrom, Duncan Cameron, Steve Gibson, Jon Goin, Dann Huff, Bobby Thompson, Rafe Van Hoy - guitar
David Hungate, Tom Robb, Jack Williams, Bob Wray - bass
Larrie Londin, James Stroud - drums
Farrell Morris - percussion
Mike Lewis, Jack Williams - string arrangements
The Shelly Kurland Strings - strings
Dan Seals, Sherri Huffman, Lisa Silver, Diane Tidwell - backing vocals

1982 albums
Dan Seals albums
Atlantic Records albums
Albums produced by Kyle Lehning